Acraea mansya is a butterfly in the family Nymphalidae. It is found in Zambia and the Democratic Republic of the Congo (Haut-Lomani).

Description

A. mansya Eltr. (60 a) has an expanse of 40 to 50 mm.. and differs from the two following nearly allied species [ Acraea nohara and Acraea chambezi ] only in not having the veins of the forewing edged with black at the distal margin and in the discal dot in cellule 3 of the hindwing being placed almost midway between the marginal band and the cell. The female is lighter than the male. Rhodesia.

Taxonomy
It is a member of the Acraea cepheus species group. See also Pierre & Bernaud, 2014.

References

Butterflies described in 1911
mansya